The X-Ray Cafe was a small music venue in Portland, Oregon, United States from 1990 to 1994. An all-ages and community-oriented club, the X-Ray played a "heavyweight role in shaping Portland's underground culture," fostering such musical acts as Elliott Smith, Team Dresch, and Quasi, and hosted national acts like Bikini Kill and Green Day and was described by Details as one of the best rock and roll clubs in the country. Located at 214 W. Burnside St., it was characterized by a surreal environment and performers; owners Tres Shannon and Benjamin Arthur Ellis, who took over the U.F.O Cafe to establish the X-Ray and were in the band The Kurtz Project, encouraged acts that featured instruments that aren't typically associated with rock music, like Big Daddy Meatstraw, who performed on stage in clown costumes. As grunge and alternative music were emerging in Portland and Seattle under a national spotlight, the X-Ray served as an important stage for smaller acts in the genre, and along with nearby Satyricon nightclub, established Portland as an important regional performing destination for touring bands.

The X-Ray was in operation  from 1990 to 1994.

The club is the subject of a 2000 documentary, "X-Ray Visions," directed by former owner Ellis.

Owner Richard "Tres" Shannon III has remained a prominent figure in Portland. He booked music for neighboring club Berbati's Pan, and later opened Voodoo Doughnut. He has also run for Mayor of Portland and City Council, and founded the innovative karaoke band Karaoke from Hell.

The X-Ray Cafe was the site of a small but controversial riot in 1993.

See also 
 Music of Oregon

References

External links 
 Oregon Encyclopedia article: http://www.oregonencyclopedia.org/articles/x_ray_cafe/

1990 establishments in Oregon
1994 disestablishments in Oregon
Defunct music venues in Portland, Oregon
Defunct nightclubs in Portland, Oregon
Old Town Chinatown
Southwest Portland, Oregon